Bard Peak is a high and prominent mountain summit in the Front Range of the Rocky Mountains of North America.

Mountain

See also

List of mountain peaks of North America
List of mountain peaks of the United States
List of mountain peaks of Colorado

References

External links

Bard Peak on 13ers.com
Bard Peak on listsofjohn.com
Bard Peak on peakery.com
Bard Peak on summitpost.org

Mountains of Colorado
Mountains of Clear Creek County, Colorado
North American 4000 m summits
Arapaho National Forest